The third The Strangers film is an upcoming American slasher film directed by Renny Harlin, and written by Alan R. Cohen and Alan Freedland. It is the third film in The Strangers film series.  The film stars stars Madelaine Petsch, Froy Gutierrez, Rachel Shenton. 

Intended to be the first installment of a new trilogy of films, the plot centers around a couple who come into contact with the three psychopathic masked strangers from the previous two installments. Marketed as a reboot, the film will "expand" the "world of The Strangers".

Synopsis
A young woman (Petsch), drives across the country with her longtime boyfriend (Gutierrez), as the pair begin a new life together in the Pacific Northwest. Along the way, their car breaks down and they are forced to spend the night in an isolated Airbnb home. Through the night they are terrorized by three murderous masked strangers.

Cast
 Madelaine Petsch as Maya
 Froy Gutierrez as Ryan
 Rachel Shenton as Debbie
 Gabriel Basso
 Ema Horvath
 Florian Clare as Chris Sampson
 Rebecka Johnston as Lucy
 Miles Yekinni as Marcus
 Ben Cartwright as Rudy
 Janis Ahern as Carol
 Ryan Bown 
 Brooke Lena Johnson 
 Ella Bruccoleri
 Stevee Davies
 Brian Law

Production

Development
In August 2022, producer Roy Lee announced plans for three sequels to consecutively enter production beginning in September of the same year. Renny Harlin was revealed as director for at least one of the sequels, though he was in negotiations to perhaps serve in that capacity on each of the films.

Later that month Harlin was officially announced as director on the three upcoming films; the first of the new trilogy, from a script written by Alan R. Cohen and Alan Freedland. Courtney Solomon, Mark Canton, Christopher Milburn, Gary Raskin, Charlie Dombeck, and Alastair Birlingham served as producers on the three films. The new trilogy is intended to be a relaunch of the series with producer Canton stating that the trilogy is intended to introduce new audiences to "world of The Strangers". Solomon stated that when they began the project the intent was to tell a bigger story than before, respecting what fans of the series expect, but also to "expand that world". The producer describes the three films as a "character study", compared to the previous two films. The trilogy will be produced by Lionsgate Entertainment and Frame Film, and will be distributed by Lionsgate Films.

Casting
In September 2022, Madelaine Petsch, Froy Gutierrez and Gabriel Basso were cast. In October 2022, Ema Horvath was announced to be a part of the cast. The following month, Rachel Shenton joined the cast.

Filming
Principal photography commenced in September 2022 in Bratislava, Slovakia and wrapped in November 2022.

Future

Two additional films were announced, with Petsch and Gutierrez reprising their respective roles.

References

External links
 

The Strangers (film series)
2020s slasher films
American horror thriller films
American serial killer films
American slasher films
Films directed by Renny Harlin
Films set in Oregon
Films shot in Slovakia
Vertigo Entertainment films
Upcoming English-language films
Reboot films